Yoga teacher training is the training of teachers of yoga as exercise, consisting mainly of the practice of yoga asanas, leading to certification. Such training is accredited by the Yoga Alliance in America, by the British Wheel of Yoga in the United Kingdom, and by the European Union of Yoga across Europe. The Yoga Alliance sets standards for 200-hour and 500-hour Recognized Yoga Teacher levels, which are accepted in America and other countries.

Standards

In America, the Yoga Alliance sets the 200-hour and 500-hour Recognized Yoga Teacher levels (RYT-200 and RYT-500). Training courses (200 hours initially for the RYT-200, then 300 hours to reach RYT-500) to qualify at these levels are provided by many independent yoga schools, teaching varied styles of yoga, both in America and other countries, including Britain. Yoga International notes that established yoga studios often require their teachers to pass the studios' own training courses.

The British Wheel of Yoga (BWY) in the United Kingdom offers Level 4 qualifications (Certificate in Yoga Teaching, Diploma in Teaching Yoga), stated to be equivalent to an HNC or the first year of a university degree. Training is provided by BWY itself; accreditation is by a separate organisation, BWYQ which split from BWY in 2009. The BWY is recognised by Sport England as the governing body of yoga in Britain (and in Northern Ireland, the Yoga Fellowship of Northern Ireland), though without power to enforce decisions. Qualifications are in turn regulated by the regulator of qualification standards Ofqual. By 2015, nine schools were accredited to teach to BWY standards; other schools were free to offer their own courses, often shorter and cheaper than the BWY's, as long as they did not claim to be to approved by the BWY.

Across Europe, standards are set by the European Union of Yoga (EUY), which has some 24 member associations in at least 15 countries including Austria, Belgium, Britain, Finland, France, Germany, Ireland, Israel, Italy, Netherlands, Portugal, Romania, Slovakia, Spain, and Switzerland. The EUY standards require a minimum of 500 hours of class instruction over a period of four years, assessed by an oral examination, a written examination, and a practical teaching demonstration.

Syllabuses

The syllabuses taught to trainee teachers vary with the school but include the components of hatha yoga, namely asanas, pranayama, and bandhas, and sometimes details of the subtle body with chakras, nadis and koshas; meditation; anatomy and physiology; psychology and philosophy of yoga; teaching methods; and the practicalities of running a yoga business. Some attention may be given to specific techniques such as Restorative Yoga and yoga nidra. Syllabuses are more tightly constrained if they are for registration with the Yoga Alliance or the British Wheel of Yoga.

Courses

Yoga teacher training, as of 2017, could cost between $2,000 and $5,000. It can take up to 3 years to obtain a teaching certificate. Shorter courses are offered in India, especially in the yoga hubs of Rishikesh and Mysore, and many Westerners travel to India hoping to learn "authentic" yoga in ashrams there.

See also

 Ashtanga Vinyasa Yoga
 Bikram Yoga
 Iyengar Yoga
 Sivananda Yoga

References

External links 

 Yoga Alliance
 British Wheel of Yoga
 BDY (Berufsverband der Yogalehrenden in Deutschland e.V.) 
 European Union of Yoga